Pine Springs is a city in Washington County, Minnesota, United States. The population was 408 at the 2010 census.

Geography
Interstate 694 and Minnesota State Highway 36 are two of the main routes in the community.

Demographics

2010 census
As of the census of 2010, there were 408 people, 144 households, and 124 families living in the city. The racial makeup of the city was 89.5% White, 3.2% African American, 4.7% Asian, 2.5% from other races, and 0.2% from two or more races. Hispanic or Latino of any race were 2.9% of the population.

There were 144 households, of which 34.0% had children under the age of 18 living with them, 78.5% were married couples living together, 6.9% had a female householder with no husband present, 0.7% had a male householder with no wife present, and 13.9% were non-families. 11.8% of all households were made up of individuals, and 4.9% had someone living alone who was 65 years of age or older. The average household size was 2.83 and the average family size was 3.04.

The median age in the city was 50.3 years. 23% of residents were under the age of 18; 8.8% were between the ages of 18 and 24; 10.9% were from 25 to 44; 43% were from 45 to 64; and 14.5% were 65 years of age or older. The gender makeup of the city was 50.0% male and 50.0% female.

2000 census
As of the census of 2000, there were 421 people, 140 households, and 120 families living in the city. The racial makeup of the city was 95.96% White, 1.43% African American, 1.19% Asian, 1.43% from other races. Hispanic or Latino of any race were 1.90% of the population.

There were 140 households, out of which 39.3% had children under the age of 18 living with them, 80.7% were married couples living together, 4.3% had a female householder with no husband present, and 13.6% were non-families. 11.4% of all households were made up of individuals, and 0.7% had someone living alone who was 65 years of age or older.  The average household size was 3.01 and the average family size was 3.22.

In the city, the population was spread out, with 28.7% under the age of 18, 6.7% from 18 to 24, 20.2% from 25 to 44, 36.8% from 45 to 64, and 7.6% who were 65 years of age or older.  The median age was 43 years. For every 100 females, there were 104.4 males.  For every 100 females age 18 and over, there were 106.9 males.

The median income for a household in the city was $102,496, and the median income for a family was $104,670. Males had a median income of $61,250 versus $42,188 for females. The per capita income for the city was $38,383.  None of the families and 0.5% of the population were living below the poverty line, including no under eighteens and none of those over 64.

References

Cities in Minnesota
Cities in Washington County, Minnesota